Manuel Fernández de Santa Cruz y Sahagún (18 January 1637, Palencia (Spain) – 1 February 1699, Puebla (Mexico)) was a religious writer and Roman Catholic prelate who served as Bishop of Guadalajara (19 February 1674 – 2 June 1676), and Bishop of Tlaxcala (2 June 1676 – 1 February 1699). As well as founding charitable institutions in his diocese, he published Sor Juana's Carta atenagórica (critiquing a sermon by António Vieira) - without her permission (albeit under a pseudonym) and told her to focus on religious instead of secular studies, despite agreeing with her criticisms.

Biography
Manuel Fernández de Santa Cruz y Sahagún was born on January 18, 1637, in Palencia, Spain and ordained a priest in 1661. On February 19, 1674, he was selected by the King of Spain and confirmed by Pope Clement X as Bishop of Guadalajara. He was consecrated bishop by Payo Afán Enríquez de Ribera Manrique de Lara, Archbishop of México, with Juan de Ortega Cano Montañez y Patiño, Bishop of Durango as co-consecrator. He was installed on September 29, 1675. On March 31, 1676, he was selected by the King of Spain and confirmed on October 19, 1676, by Pope Innocent XI as Bishop of Tlaxcala. He was installed on August 9, 1677. He served as Bishop of Tlaxcala until his death on February 1, 1699.

Episcopal succession
While bishop, he served as the Principal Consecrator of:

References

External links and additional sources
 (for Chronology of Bishops) 
 (for Chronology of Bishops) 
 (for Chronology of Bishops) 
 (for Chronology of Bishops) 
http://www.upo.es/depa/webdhuma/areas/arte/actas/3cibi/documentos/006f.pdf

1637 births
1699 deaths
17th-century Roman Catholic bishops in Mexico
Bishops appointed by Pope Innocent XI
Bishops appointed by Pope Clement X